Canadian singer and songwriter Shawn Mendes has released three studio albums, an extended play and two live albums since his debut in 2013. This has resulted in four concert tours (all of them worldwide), and numerous TV and award shows performances. He first released an extended play named The Shawn Mendes EP in July 2014. The EP got promoted through 2014, through performances at several award ceremonies and television shows, including the Jingle Ball and The Ellen DeGeneres Show. Mendes has served as an opening act for Austin Mahone on the North American leg of his 2014 tour. He also has served as the opening act for Taylor Swift’s 1989 World Tour on selected dates of the tour's North American leg.

In 2014 he embarked on his debut concert tour, #ShawnsFirstHeadlines, which only visited North America and Europe and grossed over a million dollars. He embarked on his second world tour Shawn Mendes World Tour in 2016 to promote his first studio album Handwritten (2015). The tour visited North America, Europe, Oceania and the Philippines. After completion, the tour grossed over $3.8 million and over 95,000 people had gone to one of the tour's stops. The Madison Square Garden show in September 2016 was filmed for a live album that got released three months later.

Mendes' next tour was named Illuminate World Tour. It began in April 2017 and ended in December 2017 visiting North America, Europe, Asia, Oceania and Brazil. It was reported that the tour had grossed over $37 million becoming his highest-grossing tour to date. The tour supported the release of his second studio album, Illuminate which was released in September 2016. The only show in Mexico was cancelled due to the 2017 Central Mexico earthquake. In November 2017, Mendes released his MTV Unplugged live album which was filmed at the Ace Hotel in Los Angeles in early September.

In May 2018 Mendes announced his fourth world tour called Shawn Mendes: The Tour. The tour will start in Amsterdam in March 2019 and will visit Europe, North America and Oceania. Before going on that 2019 tour, he had embarked on a big festival tour in 2018 to support his self-titled album which was released in May 2018.

Concert tours

Festival tours

Live performances

Handwritten era

Illuminate era

Shawn Mendes era

References 

Live performances
Lists of concerts and performances